Target in the Clouds (German: Ziel in den Wolken) is a 1939 German drama film directed by Wolfgang Liebeneiner and starring Albert Matterstock, Leny Marenbach and Brigitte Horney. It was based on a novel by Hans Rabl. The film portrays the struggles of the fictional German aviation pioneer Walter von Suhr, an officer in the pre-First World War German army who saw the potential for military aircraft.

The film's sets were designed by the art directors Otto Erdmann, Hans Sohnle and Wilhelm Vorwerg. It premiered at the Ufa-Palast am Zoo in Berlin.

Cast
 Albert Matterstock as Walter von Suhr  
 Leny Marenbach as Tilde von Gräwenitz 
 Brigitte Horney as Margot Boje  
 Werner Fuetterer as Dieter von Kamphausen 
 Volker von Collande as Ewald Menzel  
 Christian Kayßler as Krasselt  
 Willi Rose as Lehmann 
 Margarete Kupfer as Frau Menzel 
 Gisela von Collande as Elsi Menzel  
 Franz Weber as Herr von Suhr  
 Gertrud de Lalsky as Frau von Suhr 
 Liesl Eckardt as Frau Rühde, Magd auf dem Grävenitz-Gut 
 Max Harry Ernst as Ein Gast im Lokal 
Paul Hildebrandt  as Zuschauer bei der Flugvorführung  
Hans Junkermann as Leslie  
Malte Jäger  as  Der Offizier, der den Frau-Wirtin-Vers aufsagt  
Willy Kaiser-Heyl  as  Zuschauer bei der Flugvorführung  
Wilhelm P. Krüger  as Der Dorfschullehrer  
Olga Limburg as Frau von Gräwenitz  
Kurt Mikulski  as  Ein französischer Flugzeugmonteur  
Hadrian Maria Netto as Oberst von Salis  
Joachim Rake as Der junge Adjutant des Hauptmann von Selbitz  
Heinrich Schroth as Hauptmann von Selbitz 
Else Valery  as Die Besitzerin des Lokals  
Robert Vincenti-Lieffertz  as Der Adjutant des Oberleutnants von Suhr 
Leopold von Ledebur  as Ein Gast bei Grävenitz 
Michael von Newlinsky  as Ein Zuschauer am Flugplatz 
 Elsa Wagner  as Tante Guste 
 Herbert Weissbach as  Zuschauer bei der Flugvorführung
 Hans Grade as Hans Grade, winner of the Lanz Price

References

Bibliography 
 Paris, Michael. From the Wright Brothers to Top Gun: Aviation, Nationalism, and Popular Cinema. Manchester University Press, 1995.

External links 
 

1939 films
Films of Nazi Germany
German historical drama films
1930s historical drama films
1930s German-language films
German films based on actual events
German aviation films
Films set in Germany
Films set in 1909
Films set in 1910
Films directed by Wolfgang Liebeneiner
Terra Film films
German black-and-white films
1939 drama films
1930s German films